Dipsas incerta, Jan's snail-eater, is a non-venomous snake found in French Guiana Suriname, Guiana, and Brazil.

References

Dipsas
Snakes of South America
Reptiles of French Guiana
Reptiles of Suriname
Reptiles of Guyana
Reptiles of Brazil
Reptiles described in 1863
Taxa named by Giorgio Jan